Triyuga is one of eight municipalities of Udayapur district of the Koshi Pradesh of Nepal. Gaighat is the headquarter of the municipality. According to the 1991 Nepal census, it had a population of 55,291. According to the 2011 Nepal census, Triyuga had 87,557 inhabitants. According to the 2021 Nepal census the initial population of the municipality is 104,375. It is divided into 16 wards. Triyuga Municipality was established on B.S. Chaitra 13, 2053 (26 March 1997). It was named after Triyuga River. A river which flows through the town. Triyuga is the 3rd largest municipality in Nepal and 1st largest in Koshi Pradesh in term of size (area). The total area of the municipality is 

Almost all facilities are available in the town. Schools, colleges, Hospitals and clinics are available in the town. There are six police stations and armed police force in the town, and an army barrack is also situated in the city.

Background
Triyuga municipality was established on 26 March 1997 merging 3 VDCs: e.g. Gaighat, Deuri and Bhumarashuwa.

On 6 March 2017, following VDCs added into Triyuga municipality: Jogidaha, Saune, Khanbu and Jalpachilaune.

Ward division
Triyuga municipality is divided into 16 wards:

Geography

Triyuga is one municipality out of four municipalities of Udayapur District. The municipality is surrounded by Mahabharat hills in north and Churey hills in south. Udayapurgadhi and Rautamai are in north of the municipality, Khotang District is in north-east and Chaudandigadhi Municipality is in east. Saptari District is in south of Triyuga Municipality.

This city is in the famous Udayapur Valley. Gaighat (गाइघाट) (other name of Triyuga) is the shadow of a historic kingdom of Sen dynasty in Udayapurgadhi (Chaudandi), this Inner Terai Valley of south-eastern Nepal has a glorious history with a bright future. Gaighat is in the plane of the Valley. Udayapur Valley is the largest valley in eastern Nepal having fabulous natural attractions such as the Triyuga river, Baruwa river flowing through the town. Koshi River is east of the city.

Demographics
 
The total population of the municipality, as of 2011 Nepal census is 87,557 in which male comprises 41,221 and female 46,336. There are 19,484 households. 74% of people of the municipality is educated. 82% male and 66.5% female are educated.

Chetri is the largest group of caste in Triyuga municipality which comprises 24.24% of people of total population of Triyuga. The second largest group of caste is Tharu people which comprises 14.91%. Rai 12.43%, Magar 9.04%, Bahun (Hill Brahman) 7.74% comprises total population of the municipality.

Nepali language is the mostly spoken language in Triyuga, which is spoken by 55.82% of people. Tharu language is secondly most spoken language, Maithili language is third most spoken language and Magar is fourth.

Education 

Education in the town is accessible.
Campuses for higher education are available at Gaighat. Triyuga Janata Multiple Campus provides undergraduate and post graduate education on management and social sciences. Baruwa Campus provides undergraduate education, management and science. Similarly Udayasi English higher secondary school provides intermediate education on science and management. There are numerous other schools for education, such as:
1. Himalayan Dale Academy, Bokse
2. Paradise Secondary school, Gaighat
3. Udayapur English School, Gaighat
4. Laligurans Secondary school, Gaighat
5. Canvas Secondary school, Gaighat
6. Sagarmatha Secondary school, Purano Gaighat
7. Rastriya janata higher secondary school, Bagaha
8. Janajyoti higher secondary school, Chuhade
9. Shree janata Higher Secondary School Deory
10. Evergreen Secondary English Boarding School
11. Shree Ram Janaki higher Secondary School, Motigada
11. B.D.M. English Boarding School, Motigada
13. Udayasi English Higher Secondary school, Jaljale
14. Baruwa Campus, Gaighat
15. Peace-Zone international Academy, Gaighat
15.Triyuga Janata Multiple Campus, Motigada
16.Shree Balmandir Secondary School, Bokse

Sports & Leisures
Tharuhat Rangsala

Football, cricket and Cycling are the most popular sports in Gaighat. Tharuhat Rangsala with a capacity of 10,000+ spectators is the largest football stadium in the city. The Udayapur Gold Cup, is held in the stadium with National Football Clubs as well as District Clubs. There is a covered hall at Bokse, where indoor events can be organized. Other facilities in the city includes Boxing Ring, Karate Ring, Table tenniscourt, Lawn Tennis court and Badminton court.

Transportation

Sagarmatha Highway from Kadmaha, Saptari connects Gaighat with the Mahendra Highway and all other part of the country. This highway connects Gaighat to Khotang and Solukhumbu Districts. Likewise Madan Bhandari highway goes through the city which connects Dharan in the East and Sindhuli in the west. The highway is opened after the completion of chatara bridge over Koshi. 
Public buses are available from Kathmandu, Biratnagar, Kakarbhitta and other cities to move to the city.
Local transportation is available within the town. Many small local routes have public transport facilities. Tempos and taxis are available for rent too. 
Sagarmatha airport is proposed to be constructed in the city.

Nearest airports
 Rajbiraj Airport (57 km by road) 
 Janakpur Airport (116 km by road)
 Biratnagar Airport (138 km by road)

Rajbiraj Airport is the nearest airport, roughly 57 km away. Shree Airlines and  Buddha Air operates daily flights between Rajbiraj and Kathmandu

The town in connected to Indian border via Thadi in Nepal and Laukaha in India which is 51 km South of Gaighat are a part of one of the agreed route for Mutual Trade between India and Nepal. Nepal Government of Nepal has set up a dedicated customs office in the town. and Government of India has set up a Land Customs Station with a Superintendent level officer.
Laukaha has Laukaha Bazar railway station which is a big line and connects to rest of India via Train and NH57 via road.

Communications 
Communication facilities is available in the town. Internet services are provided by Nepal Telecom, Subisu, Broadlink, Worldlink. Telephone services are provided by Nepal Telecom, Ncell and United Telecommunications. Both Pstn as well as cellular phones can be used in the city.

Banking
Following banking and financial institutions provides services in the city.
 Nepal Investment Bank
 NIC Asia Bank Limited
 Global IME Bank Limited
 Rastriya Banijya Bank
 Nepal Bank Limited
 Citizens Bank International Limited
 Sunrise Bank Limited
 Agriculture Development Bank
 Civil Bank Limited
 Laxmi Bank
 Sanima Bank
 Everest Bank Limited
 Nabil Bank Limited
 Siddhartha Bank Limited
 NCC Bank
 Mega Bank Nepal Limited
 Prabhu Bank Limited
 Kamana Sewa Bikash Bank
 Jyoti Bikash Bank
 Muktinath Bikash Bank

Accommodation
Hotels and restaurants are available in Gaighat. Resorts are available near Koshi Tappu Wildlife Reserve and in town. Lodges and resorts with sufficient services are available. Hotels and lodges delivers proper hospitality to the guest in the town. Fooding and lodging are available in the hotels of the town. Some of the hotels are Gangachuli Hotel, Hotel A-one, Sital Chautari.

Media
National daily newspapers like Kantipur, The Kathmandu Post, Annapurna post, The Himalayan Times, Nagarik, Republica, Gorkhapatra are available in early morning. Local television named G-music is broadcast via cable.
To promote local cultures Triyuga has FM radio stations Radio Triyuga 104 MHz, Radio Udayapur 102 MHz and which are Community radio Stations. Radio Amurta 91.6 is a commercial fm station in Tyiyuga. Cable television service is also available. Many local newspapers are published in the town on daily, weekly basis. Some of them are Majhkharka, Triyuga post, Baruwa Times.

Gallery

See also
Katari
Belaka
Chaudandigadhi

References

External links
UN map of the municipalities of Udayapur District
 Udayupur Valley / Gaighat information
 Koshi Camp
 Udayapur.com 

Populated places in Udayapur District
Triyuga Municipality
Nepal municipalities established in 1997
Municipalities in Udayapur District